2020s political history refers to significant political and societal historical events in the United Kingdom in the 2020s, presented as a historical overview in narrative format.

Boris Johnson Premiership, 2019–2022

General history
Boris Johnson won a landslide majority in the 2019 general election. In late January 2020, the United Kingdom officially left the European Union.

Special events and issues

COVID-19 pandemic

The ongoing COVID-19 pandemic spread to the United Kingdom in late January 2020.  there have been 15,147,120 confirmed cases and 151,899 confirmed deaths overall, the world's 31st-highest death-rate per capita. There were 174,233 deaths where the death certificate mentioned COVID-19 by January 15 (see Statistics). More than 90% of those dying had underlying illnesses or were over 60 years old. The infection rate is higher in care homes than in the community, which is inflating the overall infection rate. There is large regional variation in the outbreak's severity. In March, London had the highest number of infections while North East England has the highest infection rate. England is the country of the UK with the most such deaths per capita, while Northern Ireland has the lowest. Healthcare in the UK is devolved to each country.

The Department of Health and Social Care launched a public health information campaign to help slow the virus's spread, and began posting daily updates in early February. In February, the Heath Secretary, Matt Hancock, introduced the Health Protection (Coronavirus) Regulations 2020 for England, used as a template in the other parts of the UK, and hospitals set up drive-through screening. The Chief Medical Officer for England, Chris Whitty, outlined a four-pronged strategy to tackle the outbreak: contain, delay, research and mitigate.

In March, the UK government imposed a lockdown, banning all "non-essential" travel and contact with people outside one's home (including family and partners), and shutting almost all schools and other educational institutions, shops selling nonessential goods, venues, facilities, amenities and places of worship. Those with symptoms, and their household, were told to self-isolate, while the most vulnerable (the over 70s and those with certain illnesses) were told to shield themselves. People were made to keep apart in public. Police were empowered to enforce the lockdown, and the Coronavirus Act 2020 gave the government emergency powers not used since the Second World War. Panic buying was reported.

George Floyd protests

In late May and in June 2020, protests took place across the country following the murder of George Floyd, a 46-year-old African American man, by police officers while under arrest in Minneapolis, Minnesota on 25 May. Immediately after the murder, protests and riots broke out in dozens of cities across the United States. These spread internationally for the first time three days later, with a solidarity demonstration outside the United States Embassy in London.

Protests spread across the UK, particularly in London, Birmingham and Manchester. Many have been organised by the Black Lives Matter and Stand Up to Racism movements. As well as providing solidarity to protests in the United States, many of the protests highlight pockets and instances of racism in operational policy and conduct of UK policing, rehabilitation and in daily life.

Many protests have received endorsement and support from local councils and politicians, including in Liverpool and Oxford. Most such UK protests have been peaceful, although notable clashes between protesters and police have occurred many times in central London. Confrontations between police and protesters included a group spraying "ACAB" on the memorial to Earl Haig. When soldiers from the Household Cavalry in plain clothes scrubbed the graffiti off, protesters criticised them for doing so. Protesters sprayed graffiti on the plinth of the statue of Winston Churchill in Parliament Square calling him a racist. A statue of 17th-century slave trader and town benefactor Edward Colston was toppled from its pedestal in The Centre, Bristol and thrown into Bristol Harbour on 7 June. The movement having identified many divisive figures of the past, some local councils have renamed such streets and public buildings, notably the Bristol Beacon having formerly paid homage to Colston.

Liz Truss Premiership, September–October 2022 
Following her victory in the leadership election, Liz Truss was appointed Prime Minister by Queen Elizabeth II, one of her last official acts before her death. The state funeral of the Queen coincided with the proclamation of the new monarch, Charles III.

Truss along with Chancellor of the Exchequer Kwasi Kwarteng introduced sweeping budget and tax cuts in their proposed mini-budget. The proposal of the mini-budget directly resulted in the worsening of the ongoing economic crisis in the country as well as the resignation of Truss, making her the shortest-serving prime minister in history.

Rishi Sunak Premiership, 2022–Present 

Rishi Sunak was the first prime minister appointed under King Charles III as well as the first British-Asian to hold the position.

History by issue

Brexit

In January 2020, The United Kingdom and Gibraltar left the European Union, beginning an 11-month transition period, during which they remain in the Single Market and Customs Union.

Climate change
In December 2019, the World Meteorological Organization released its annual climate report revealing that climate impacts are worsening. They found the global sea temperatures are rising as well as land temperatures worldwide. 2019 is the last year in a decade that is the warmest on record.

Global carbon emissions hit a record high in 2019, even though the rate of increase slowed somewhat, according to a report from Global Carbon Project.

COVID-19 pandemic

History by major political party

Conservatives 
Leadership elections for the Scottish Conservatives were held in February and August 2020. Douglas Ross is now the leader

Labour 

As both the Labour leader (Jeremy Corbyn) and deputy leader (Tom Watson) had resigned or announced their intention to do so in late 2019, the party had both a leadership and deputy leadership contest in early 2020. The leadership contest was won by Shadow Secretary of State for Exiting the European Union Keir Starmer with 275,780 votes (56.2% of the vote share). Angela Rayner became the deputy leader, achieving 192,168 first preference votes (41.7% of the vote share) and winning a majority of votes after the third round.

Liberal Democrats 
After their leader (Jo Swinson) lost her seat at the 2019 general election, the Liberal Democrats announced early in 2020 that they planned to have new leader in place by the middle of July that year. The contest was delayed by six weeks due to the COVID-19 pandemic with the winner being declared in late August, until then MP Sir Ed Davey and the party's president Mark Pack remained its acting leadership. The contest was won by Ed Davey with 63.5% of the vote.

The Liberal Democrats were victorious in by-elections in Chesham and Amersham, North Shropshire and Tiverton and Honiton. In North Shropshire it was thought to have been the largest majority ever overturned in a by-election.

Scottish National Party 
SNP Chief Whip in the House of Commons Patrick Grady resigned following a complaint of sexual misconduct by an SNP staff member. The SNP won a plurality of seats in the 2021 Scottish Parliament election. The Third Sturgeon government was formed with support from the Scottish Greens.

Ian Blackford announced his intention to stand down from his role of Leader of the Scottish National Party in the House of Commons on 1 December 2022. He denied being forced out by SNP MPs. His successor, Stephen Flynn, was elected on 6 December.

History by devolved administration

Greater London Authority 
The London mayoral election originally due to take place in May 2020 was suspended for a year to 6 May 2021 due to the COVID-19 pandemic. The mayoral race saw London Labour's Sadiq Khan win on second preferences with 55.2% of the vote. The 2021 London Assembly election took place on the same day. The assembly elections saw Labour lose a seat while the London Conservatives, London Liberal Democrats and London Greens each gained one.

Scottish government 

The 2021 Scottish Parliament election took place on 6 May 2021. The election saw limited changes in vote share and seats with each party gaining or losing less than 2% of the overall share in each category of voting.  The SNP gained one seat but fell one short of an overall majority. The Scottish Conservatives maintained their second place position with the same number of seats as in 2016. Whilst, Scottish Labour continued in third place with a loss of two seats. The Scottish Greens gained two extra seats with a small increase in their vote share. The election also had an unusually high voter turnout compared to previous Scottish parliament elections of 63.2%. It was suggested that this may have been in part due to the Covid-19 pandemic leading to higher postal voting and lockdown giving people more time to engage with political activists and go to the polling station. Later that year, the SNP and Scottish Greens established a powersharing agreement where the later was given non-cabinet ministerial positions in exchange for support on votes of confidence, budgets and some areas of policy.

Welsh government 
The 2021 Senedd election took place on 6 May 2021. It was the first Welsh Parliament election where 16- and 17-year-olds could vote, following the enactment of Senedd and Elections (Wales) Act that lowered the voting age to 16 for Welsh Senedd elections. The election saw Welsh Labour gain one seat falling one short of an overall majority (which no party had ever achieved). The Welsh Conservatives gained five seats returning their strongest ever result of 16. Plaid Cymru made a net gain of one seat returning 13. The Welsh Liberal Democrats lost their only constituency but kept a seat through the regional vote, whilst UKIP lost all its seats from 2016 and no other party gained any. While Labour lacked an overall majority it decided to not make any kind of coalition or confidence pact and its leader Mark Drakeford was reconfirmed as First Minister of Wales a few days later with none of the other parties attempting to mount any kind of challenge. Though, in late 2021, Welsh Labour and Plaid Cymru reached a agreement to cooperate for three years.

Northern Irish Executive  
The Northern Irish Assembly returned to business in January 2020 after a three-year hiatus with a new power sharing agreement between Sinn Féin and the DUP. 

On 30 April, First Minister of Northern Ireland Arlene Foster resigned as leader of the Democratic Unionist Party. She was replaced as First Minister of Northern Ireland by Paul Givan who was confirmed on 17 July. Meanwhile the role of DUP leader was handled separately, being given first to Edwin Poots on the 14 May and following his resignation after just 21 days in the role it was taken by Jeffrey Donaldson.

British Virgin Islands 
On 28 April 2022, Premier of the British Virgin Islands Andrew Fahie was arrested in the United States on charges related to drug trafficking and money laundering. Shortly afterwards, on 5 May 2022, he was removed as Premier by a near-unanimous vote in the House of Assembly, and replaced by his deputy Natalio Wheatley. On 8 June 2022, the British Government decided against direct rule for the islands.

Deaths

History by local government 
Local elections in England as well as police and crime commissioner elections in England and Wales were postponed from May 2020 to 2021 due to the COVID-19 pandemic. Taking place on 6 May, the local elections saw the conservatives make a net gain of 294 councillors and 13 councils, whilst labour lost 264 and eight respectively. The Green Party of England and Wales gained 85 council seats and the Liberal Democrats increased their total by three. The Conservatives gained both a mayor and a police and crime commissioner of Labour, who themselves gained the same from the Conservatives and Plaid Cymru.

At the 2022 local elections, the Conservatives made a net loss of 487 seats in comparison to 2017 in Scotland and Wales and 2018 in England, whilst Labour gained 108 seats (22 in England, 20 in Scotland, and 66 in Wales). The Liberal Democrats and Greens made gains of 224 seats and 87 seats, respectively, which exceeded those of the Labour Party in England but were also seen to a more modest extent in Scotland and Wales. The Scottish National Party (SNP) gained 22 seats in Scotland whilst Plaid Cymru made a net loss of 6 seats in Wales.

See also 

2010s in United Kingdom political history
2020s in political history
2020 in United Kingdom politics and government
2021 in United Kingdom politics and government
2022 in United Kingdom politics and government
2022 United Kingdom electoral calendar
Opinion polling on the United Kingdom rejoining the European Union (2020–present)
Political history of the United Kingdom (1979–present)
Timeline of British history (1990–present)

Notes

References

 

2020 in British politics
2021 in British politics
2022 in British politics
2023 in British politics
2020s decade overviews